Flavius Syagrius was the consul for the year 381 with Flavius Eucharius as his colleague.

References

4th-century Romans
4th-century Roman consuls
Imperial Roman consuls